The 2005 AFC U-17 Women's Championship was the first instance of the AFC U-16 Women's Championship. It was held from April 16 to 27 in Namhae, South Korea.

Group stage

Group A

Group B

Group C

Ranking of second-placed teams 

Note: Group A and B's match against fourth-placed team was excluded.

Knockout stage

Semi-finals

Third place match

Final

Winners

Goal scorers
12 goals
 Natsuko Hara

11 goals
 Asano Nagasato

10 goals

 Li Lin
 Yoshie Hori

9 goals

 Li Nan
 Pitsamai Sornsai

7 goals
 Ma Xiaoxu

6 goals

 Konomi Ataeyama
 Mari Kawamura
 Ritsuko Uchibori

5 goals

 Ngangom Bala Devi
 Hitomi Ono
 Park Ji-young

4 goals

 Asuka Kakazu
 Asuna Tanaka
 Jeon Ga-eul
 Lai Li-Chin

3 goals

 Lu Aixue
 Jung Won-jung
 Kwon Hah-nul
 Thanatta Chawong

2 goals

 He Zhen
 Li Wen
 Mao Aihong
 Naomi Hatsumi
 Megumi Matsubara
 Choi Hae-sook
 Kim Soo-jin
 Lee Ye-eun
 Park Cho-rong
 Prangthip Nampeng
 Sukunya Peangthem
 Uthumphon Thongchon

1 goal

 Hasina Bagum
 Rouson Bolu
 Wang Lingling
 Wang Ni
 Xu Wenjia
 Amy Atkinson
 Cheung Wai Ki
 Yiu Hei Man
 Chanu Sanathoi Chingtham
 Maibam Bembem Devi
 Lalvarmoi Hmar
 Suganya Raju
 Ranjita Devi Thangjam
 Cho So-hyun
 Kim Cho-hee
 Yoo Young-a
 Chen Hsiao-Chuan
 Hung Chia-Chun
 Lin Man-Ting
 Wajee Kertsombun
 Phumphuang Ngoendi
 Sasima Panratsamee

Own goal
 Ayesha Akthar (for Japan)
 Shameema Pinki (for Hong Kong)
 Tan Rui Ling Joleen (for China)
 Suhanthi Thangarajoo (for China)
 Sirirat Sarian (for China)

See also
2002 AFC U-19 Women's Championship

AFC U-16 Women's Championship
AFC
Women
2005
2005 in South Korean football
2005 in youth association football